Parsons Green is an above-ground London Underground station on the  branch of the District line that opened in 1880. There are entrances on Parsons Green Lane and in Beaconsfield Walk. The station is a short distance north of the green itself.

History

Past plans
Parsons Green was a proposed stop on the Chelsea-Hackney Line, known now as Crossrail 2. It would have either supplemented or replaced the existing District line service on much of the Wimbledon Branch.

North of the station, the line would have branched off into a new tunneled section that could carry it into  station, via a new station on the Kings Road,  station. Crossrail 2 will be built to National Rail standards and will go to Wimbledon via Clapham Junction instead. The route was safeguarded in 1991 and again in 2007.

Bombing

On 15 September 2017, around 8:20am BST, an explosion inspired by ISIL on a train carriage at the station injured 30 people. No fatalities were reported. The explosion was treated by the Metropolitan Police as a terrorist incident.

The attacker, Ahmed Hassan, was tried for attempted murder in March 2018. He was convicted and sentenced to life imprisonment and must serve a minimum of 34 years. On 6 April 2019 it was announced that Lt. Col. Craig Palmer, a passenger on the affected tube train, had been awarded the Queen's Commendation for Bravery for his part in helping to bring the bomber to trial and conviction.

Sidings
Parsons Green is an intermediate terminating point for both District line services. Below are the seven sidings explained:
Two sidings east of the station:
One is only accessible from the eastbound running line, and can accommodate two D Stock or two S Stock trains
The second is only accessible from the westbound running line and can accommodate one D Stock or one S Stock train
Five sidings west of the station:
Two sidings west of the eastbound platform. These are accessible from the westbound platform and accommodate one D Stock or S Stock train
Two sidings west of the westbound, also accessible from the westbound platform.
There is a siding just behind the westbound platform, which could only fit a C Stock train. As C Stock trains are no longer in use on the system, this siding is out of commission.

Gallery

References

External links

 
 

District line stations
Proposed Chelsea-Hackney Line stations
Tube stations in the London Borough of Hammersmith and Fulham
Former Metropolitan District Railway stations
Railway stations in Great Britain opened in 1880